Downham is a civil parish in Ribble Valley, Lancashire, England.  It contains 43 listed buildings that are recorded in the National Heritage List for England.  Of these, three are at Grade II*, the middle grade, and the others are at Grade II, the lowest grade.  The parish contains the village of Downham and surrounding countryside.  Most of the listed buildings are in the village, and include Downham Hall and associated structures, houses and cottages, a church, a public house, a school, milestones, a bridge, and a set of stocks.  Outside the village the listed buildings are farmhouses and farm buildings.

Key

Buildings

References

Citations

Sources

Lists of listed buildings in Lancashire
Buildings and structures in Ribble Valley